CD-190 or No. 190 was a Type D escort ship of the Imperial Japanese Navy during World War II.

History
She was laid down on 20 November 1944 at the Nagasaki shipyard of Mitsubishi Heavy Industries for the benefit of the Imperial Japanese Navy and launched on 16 January 1945. On 21 February 1945, she was completed and commissioned. On 28 July 1945, she was attacked by planes from Task Force 38 and heavily damaged in the Yura Straits off Tomogashima. On 15 August 1945, Japan announced their unconditional surrender and she was turned over to the Allies in September 1945 at Shiminoseki. On 30 November 1945, she was struck from the Navy List and scrapped on 31 March 1948.

References

1945 ships
Type D escort ships
Ships built by Mitsubishi Heavy Industries